This article provides the family tree of Zhu Shizhen, the father of the Ming dynasty's founder Zhu Yuanzhang.

Ancestors

Zhu Zhongba

Zhu Zhongba and Lady Chen had three sons: Zhu Liu'er, Zhu Shi'er and Zhu Bailiu.

Zhu Bailiu

Zhu Bailiu and Lady Hu had two sons: Zhu Siwu and Zhu Sijiu.

Zhu Sijiu

Zhu Sijiu and Lady Hou had four sons: Zhu Chuyi, Zhu Chu'er, Zhu Chuwu (Zhu Xiao) and Zhu Chushi.

Zhu Chuyi

Zhu Chuyi and Lady Wang had four sons: Zhu Wuyi, Zhu Wu'er, a third one, who died young and Zhu Shizhen.

Zhu Wuyi

Zhu Wuyi had four sons: Zhu Zhongyi, Zhu Zhong'er, Zhu Zhongsan and Zhu Zhongwu.

Zhu Zhongyi was married to Lady Di, they had two sons, Zhu Saige and Zhu Tiege.

Zhu Zhongsan had four sons: Zhu Zhuan, Zhu Ji, Zhu Sao and Zhu Run.

Zhu Shizhen

Zhu Shizhen and Lady Chen had four sons — Zhu Xinglong, Zhu Xingsheng, Zhu Xingzu and Zhu Yuanzhang —  and two daughters —  Grand Princess Taiyuan (personal name unknown) and Zhu Fonü. Zhu Xingzu died without an heir.

Zhu Xinglong

Zhu Xinglong and Lady Wang had two sons and a daughter: Zhu Shengbao, Zhu Wenzheng and Princess Fucheng (personal name unknown). Princess Fucheng married Wang Kegong.

Zhu Wenzheng married Xie Cuiying, the daughter of Xie Zaixing. They had a son, Zhu Shouqian. Zhu Wenzheng also had a daughter, whose name is unknown. The daughter was elder than Zhu Shouqian.

Zhu Xingsheng

Zhu Xingsheng's son was Zhu Wang. Zhu Wang had no heir.

Grand Princess Taiyuan

Grand Princess Taiyuan was married to Wang Qiyi, they had no son.

Grand Princess of Cao

Zhu Fonü was married to Li Zhen, they had a son, Li Wenzhong. Li Wenzhong had three sons: Li Jinglong, Li Zengzhi and Li Fangying.

See also
 Family tree of Chinese monarchs (late)#Ming dynasty and Southern Ming

References

Ming dynasty
Dynasty genealogy